Live at Red Rocks is the fourth live album of The John Butler Trio. It was recorded on 4 June 2010 at Red Rocks Amphitheatre, and was streamed live to fans around the world at Livestream. The album was released in July 2011.

Track listing
Disc 1
 "Introduction" – 0:57
 "Used to Get High" – 4:27
 "I'd Do Anything" – 3:46
 "Betterman" – 8:31
 "Don't Wanna See Your Face" – 3:37
 "Revolution" – 6:47
 "Hoe Down" – 0:55
 "Better Than" – 3:18
 "Johnny's Gone" – 3:43
 "Take Me" – 4:51
 "Treat Yo Mama" – 10:40
 "Losing You" (featuring Mama Kin) – 5:25
 "Intro to Ocean" – 1:29
 "Ocean" – 12:02

Disc 2
 "Ragged Mile" – 3:59
 "Zebra" – 7:07
 "Good Excuse" – 17:00
 "C'mon Now" – 2:39
 "Close to You" – 6:06
 "Peaches and Cream" – 7:04
 "One Way Road" – 5:24
 "Funky Tonight" – 11:51

Personnel
John Butler – vocals, acoustic guitar, electric guitar, 12 string guitar, lap steel guitar, banjo
Byron Luiters – electric bass, double bass, didgeridoo, vocals
Nicky Bomba – drums, percussion, steel drums, vocals

Various
 Byron Luiters broke a string of his electric bass in the middle of his solo. Nicky Bomba has had to play while the bass has been replaced.
 Nicky Bomba broke a rind of his tom just in the middle of his solo.
 The amphitheatre is built on an Indian sacred site.
 The show was preceded by an exhibition of Indians (Native Americans) invited by the trio.
 Butler's wife made an appearance to sing with John.

References

External links
 The John Butler Trio official homepage

2011 live albums
John Butler Trio albums
Albums recorded at Red Rocks Amphitheatre